Lamentation over the Dead Body of Christ (known as Lamentation) is an oil painting on wood panel completed by a follower of the German Renaissance artist Lucas Cranach the Elder during the 1530s. It is considered to be among the most valued works of art to have been plundered from Polish collections during World War II.

The painting, which had been in the collection of the Schlesische Museum der Bildenden Künste in Breslau (now National Museum, Wrocław) since 1880, was evacuated in the aftermath of Siege of Breslau in November 1945 and had gone missing by 1946. It 1970, Lamentation entered the collection of the Nationalmuseum in Stockholm. Following a years-long investigation by the Polish government, the painting was officially restituted to the National Museum in Wrocław in 2022.

Analysis 
The work is said to have been commissioned by the German merchant Konrad von Günterode and Anna née von Alnpeck, whose coat of arms is placed in the lower half of the composition. The two patrons, together with their four children, are depicted as participants in the scene of lamentation of Christ, a popular Renaissance subject matter capturing highly pious and emotional moment when the body of Jesus had been taken off the cross, are seen standing next to the Biblical figures of Virgin Mary, Mary Magdalene and John the Evangelist. 

It is one of several paintings completed by Cranach the Elder and his studio focusing on the subject of lamentation during the early decades of the 16th century. Painted in the aftermath of the Protestant Reformation, the work is said to emphasize individual religious experience. According to the art historian Piotr Oszczanowski, the artist blurs the hierarchy of importance among depicted figures and captures the individuality of their respective emotional responses.

History 
Sometime in the 18th century, the painting, known as Opłakiwanie Chrystusa in Polish, had entered the collection of the Cisterian monastery in Lubiąż where it remained until its transfer to Schlesische Museum der Bildenden Künste in Breslau (now National Museum, Wrocław) in 1880. In November 1945, following the Siege of Breslau, Lamentation was evacuated from the museum and registered as one of the artworks to be safeguarded in the Kamieniec Ząbkowicki Palace near Wrocław. The list comprised 252 works of art with Lamentation included as position no. 28 with an annotation "S.H.K 125," indicating the abbreviated name of the Breslau museum and its inventory number.  

By February 1946, hundreds of works stored in the palace had gone missing. Many of these, including Lamentation, would later re-emerge in Mariefred, Sweden as belonging to the Swedish businessman Sigfrid Häggberg. According to his family, however, Häggberg had not directly participated in the theft and was merely safekeeping the painting on behalf of an unidentified individual. After his death in 1963, the painting was sold to the Nationalmuseum in Stockholm at an auction in 1970 for SEK4,000 (~US$3,700 in 2023 when adjusted for inflation) and placed in the museum's permanent collection.

Restitution to Poland 
In 2020, following an extensive and lengthy investigation by the Ministry of Culture and National Heritage in Poland, the Nationalmuseum in Stockholm recommended that Lamentation be restituted to the National Museum in Wrocław. In 2022, the painting was officially returned. According to the Susanna Pettersson, the Director General of the Nationalmuseum in Stockholm, the case illustrated the importance of investing in "provenance research and restitution."

References 

Renaissance art
Painting
German Renaissance painters
German Renaissance
Christian art
Reformation in Germany
Art crime